Kahriz (also Romanized as Kahrīz) is a village in Qezel Uzan Rural District, in the Central District of Meyaneh County, East Azerbaijan Province, Iran. At the 2006 census, its population was 174, in 35 families.

References 

fa;کهریز (میانه)

Populated places in Meyaneh County